Oreocossus is a genus of moths in the family Cossidae.

Species
Oreocossus grzimeki Yakovlev, 2011
Oreocossus gurkoi Yakovlev, 2011
Oreocossus kilimanjarensis (Holland, 1892)
Oreocossus occidentalis Strand, 1913
Oreocossus politzari Yakovlev & Saldaitis, 2011
Oreocossus ungemachi Rougeot, 1977

References

Natural History Museum Lepidoptera generic names catalog

Zeuzerinae